Harry Lyman Davis (January 25, 1878 – May 21, 1950) was an American politician of the Republican Party.  He served as the 38th and 44th mayor of Cleveland, Ohio and as the 49th governor of Ohio.

Life and career
Davis was born in Cleveland, Ohio on January 25, 1878 in the Newburgh area to Evan and Barbara Jones Davis.  At age thirteen, he left school to work in the steel mills, studying at home and night school.  He became a solicitor for the Cleveland Telephone Co. at age twenty-one and later founded the Davis Rate Adjustment Co., selling telephone securities and the Harry L. Davis Co., selling insurance.

In 1909, Davis was elected Republican city treasurer.  David defeated his opponent Peter Witt in the 1915 Cleveland mayoral election.  As the city's new mayor, Davis established the Mayor's Advisory War Committee in 1917 to aid the American effort in World War I.  His work gained national recognition.  Mayor Davis also had to deal with the communist May Day Riots of 1919 and the bombing of his home by communist agitators; the Red Scare presented a new set of dilemmas.  Davis responded to the outrages by campaigning for the expulsion of all "Bolsheviks" from America. Since 1919 was an election year, Davis resigned from the mayor's office and went on to successfully campaign for governor of Ohio.

Davis won the governor's seat and served one term.  While in office, Davis restructured the executive branch to include a cabinet of seven directors to help administer state affairs.  Davis did not run again in 1922, but rather 1924, when he was soundly defeated by incumbent A. Victor Donahey.  Davis later returned to Cleveland and became a strong opponent of the city manager plan.  He later served again as mayor from 1934 to 1935.

Death
In his later years, Davis suffered from frequent periods of ill health.  He died at his home in Shaker Heights, Ohio, on May 21, 1950, soon after he was stricken with a blood clot in the brain. He was buried at Lake View Cemetery in Cleveland.

References

Further reading
 The Encyclopedia Of Cleveland History by Cleveland Bicentennial Commission (Cleveland, Ohio), David D. Van Tassel (Editor), and John J. Grabowski (Editor)

External links 
 

1878 births
1950 deaths
Republican Party governors of Ohio
Mayors of Cleveland
Burials at Lake View Cemetery, Cleveland
20th-century American politicians